Mike Wilson (born February 7, 1983) is an American professional boxer who has held the WBA-NABA cruiserweight title since 2018. As an amateur, he was a two-time U.S. National champion at super heavyweight.

Amateur
He started to box in 1997 and participated in the WorldJuniorChampionships 2000 where he lost in the first round to Caba Kurtusz.

2004 he lost to Jason Estrada in the Olympic qualification who had beaten him before and was only Olympic alternate, but after Estrada turned pro Wilson dominated the domestic scene.
He upset George Garcia (the American participant at the world championships 2003) twice and Travis Kauffman several times which convinced Garcia and Kaufman to turn pro. He also has a DQ win over Mike Marrone but lost to him at the PAL championship 2003.

He became US champion in 2004 and 2005.

Internationally his success has been mixed.
At the World Championships 2005 in Mianyang, China´he dec. Amanissi Mohamed, MAR, 27-20, in first round; dec. Rustam Rygebaev, KAZ, 26-18, in second round; but was defeated by world class southpaw (and 2007 world champion) Roberto Cammarelle, ITA, RSCO-2.

In 2007 he had a 10:13 loss to Didier Bence of Canada and Oscar Rivas of Colombia but qualified for the PanAm Games where he was controversially stopped by Bence after leading on points.

In the finals of the US championships 2007 he suffered from a tough draw, he beat Golden Gloves winners Felix Stewart and Nathaniel James but lost 24:25 to Michael Hunter jr.

At the Olympic Trials he surprisingly lost to Kimdo Bethel, but beat N.James again to get a rematch with Bethel. After Bethel beat him for a second time he cannot qualify for the Olympics 2008 any more.

Pro
He turned pro in September 2009 at Cruiserweight and is now 21-2.

External links

USA boxing
Failed test

1983 births
Living people
Boxers from Oregon
Heavyweight boxers
Winners of the United States Championship for amateur boxers
People from Central Point, Oregon
American male boxers